Service Creek is a  long 2nd order tributary to the Haw River, in Alamance County, North Carolina.

Course
Service Creek rises in a pond at Glen Raven in Alamance County and then flows northeast and makes a turn southeast to the Haw River about 0.25 miles east of Burlington, North Carolina.

Watershed
Service Creek drains  of area, receives about 45.8 in/year of precipitation, and has a wetness index of 432.18 and is about 13% forested.

See also
List of rivers of North Carolina

References

Rivers of North Carolina
Rivers of Alamance County, North Carolina